Abdollah Karami (born February 27, 1983) is a former Iranian footballer who played for Foolad in the Persian Gulf Pro League recently.

Club career
Karami joined Shahin Bushehr in 2007 after spending the previous two seasons at Foolad. He signed a two-year with Sepahan in the summer of 2014 and was given number 10 jersey.

Club career statistics

Honours
Foolad
Iran Pro League (1): 2013–14

Sepahan
Iran Pro League (1): 2014–15

References

1983 births
Living people
Persian Gulf Pro League players
Azadegan League players
Foolad FC players
Shahin Bushehr F.C. players
Iranian footballers
Association football defenders
Sportspeople from Khuzestan province